Crombrugghia reichli is a moth of the family Pterophoridae. It is found in the eastern Mediterranean region, including Cyprus and Turkey.

Adults are on wing in May (Turkey) and from July to August (in Cyprus). There is one or possibly two generations per year.

References

External links
Acta Naturalia Pannonica

Oxyptilini
Moths described in 1998
Plume moths of Asia
Plume moths of Europe
Taxa named by Ernst Arenberger